There and Back Again was the first album by Vertical Horizon, released independently in 1992, and later re-released in 1999 by RCA Records. At the time, the band consisted solely of Matthew Scannell and Keith Kane, who together did all the writing, singing, and producing for the album, as well as playing all instruments used (mostly acoustic guitar, with little percussion and bass). The name was taken from the subtitle of The Hobbit by J.R.R. Tolkien.

Track listing
"Trying to Find Purpose" (Scannell) - 3:16
"Children's Lullaby" (Kane) - 5:20
"Footprints in the Snow" (Scannell) - 3:29
"Love's Light" (Kane) - 3:37
"The Mountain Song" (Scannell) - 2:51
"Prayer for an Innocent Man" (Kane) - 3:34
"Lines Upon Your Face" (Scannell) - 5:28
"Willingly" (Kane) - 4:46
"On the Sea" (Scannell) - 4:47
"Liberty" (Kane) - 3:05

Personnel
Vertical Horizon
 Keith Kane – vocals, acoustic guitars, percussion, production, engineering
 Matthew Scannell – vocals, acoustic and electric guitars, bass guitars, keyboards, drum programming, production, engineering, cover photography

Additional personnel
 James Hemingway – digital editing and mastering
 Katie Symons – art direction
 Liz Green – art direction
 Amy Morse – cover photography

References

1992 albums
Vertical Horizon albums
RCA Records albums